Thomas William Lyster (1855–1922) was director of the National Library of Ireland in Dublin between 1895 and his retirement in 1920.

Lyster joined the library in 1878 and was appointed as its director in 1895. He was also a scholar who translated Düntzer’s Life of Goethe in 1883 and edited a poetry schoolbook, the Intermediate School Anthology.

Although a member of the Church of Ireland, he was used by James Joyce as the model for the eponymous "quaker librarian" in his novel Ulysses. An whimsical account of him is given in Oliver St John Gogarty's As I was Going down Sackville Street when Gogarty visits the national library. In this book Lyster is very solicitous of the various needs of the readers in the library. Lyster lived at 10 Harcourt Terrace.

Works 
 1883: Heinrich Düntzer’s Life of Goethe. London: Macmillan & Co. (translation)  
A series of volumes called English Poems for Young Students (editor)
1893: Select Poetry for Young Students; 2nd ed
Intermediate School Anthology

References 

1855 births
1922 deaths
Irish librarians